Watermen: A Dirty Business is a British documentary television series that was first broadcast on BBC Two on 15 April 2014. The six-part series follows the employees of United Utilities.

Production & Location
On 16 January 2014, BBC Two commissioned Mentorn Media to make the six-part documentary series. It was commissioned by Maxine Watson.
It was filmed in many locations such as The Oaks Primary School in Bolton, Bury and the rest of the North West

Episode list

References

External links
 
 
 

2014 British television series debuts
2014 British television series endings
Television shows set in the United Kingdom
BBC high definition shows
BBC television documentaries
English-language television shows